24 Corps, 24th Corps, Twenty Fourth Corps, or XXIV Corps may refer to:

XXIV Reserve Corps (German Empire), a unit of the Imperial German Army during World War I
XXIV Army Corps (Wehrmacht), a German unit during World War II
24th Army Corps (Russian Empire)
24th Rifle Corps, Soviet Union
24th Mechanized Corps (Soviet Union)
24th Tank Corps, Soviet Union
XXIV Corps (Union Army), a unit in the American Civil War
XXIV Corps (United States)

See also
 List of military corps by number